Ochotnica Górna  is a village in the administrative district of Gmina Ochotnica Dolna, within Nowy Targ County, Lesser Poland Voivodeship, in southern Poland.

The village has an approximate population of 2,100.

References

Villages in Nowy Targ County